Kathleen Marie Kerrigan (née Sullivan; born January 20, 1964) is the chief judge of the United States Tax Court.

Biography

Kerrigan was born in Springfield, Massachusetts. She received her Bachelor of Science degree in 1985, from Boston College and her Juris Doctor degree in 1990, from the Notre Dame Law School. She served as the legislative director for United States Representative Richard E. Neal from 1991 to 1998. She was an associate and later partner at the law firm of Baker & Hostetler from 1998 to 2005. From 2005 to 2012, she served as tax counsel to the majority staff of the United States Senate Committee on Small Business and Entrepreneurship and also as staff director for the Finance Subcommittee on Social Security, Pensions, and Family Policy.

Tax Court service

On May 26, 2011, President Barack Obama nominated Kerrigan to serve as a Judge of the United States Tax Court, to the seat vacated by Judge Harry A. Haines, whose term had expired. Her nomination received a hearing before the United States Senate Committee on Finance on November 17, 2011 and was reported favorably on December 17, 2011. Her nomination was confirmed by the United States Senate on March 29, 2012. She received her commission on May 4, 2012. Her commission will expire on May 3, 2027, at which time her fifteen-year term will end. On February 25, 2022, she was elected to serve a two-year term as chief judge starting on June 1, 2022.

References

1964 births
Living people
21st-century American judges
21st-century American women judges
Boston College alumni
Judges of the United States Tax Court
Lawyers from Washington, D.C.
Notre Dame Law School alumni
People associated with BakerHostetler
People from Springfield, Massachusetts
United States Article I federal judges appointed by Barack Obama